Jagannath Pahadia  (15 January 1932 – 19 May 2021) was an Indian politician and a leader of the Indian National Congress party. He was the former Chief Minister of Rajasthan, Governor of Haryana, and Governor of Bihar. He died on 19 May 2021 from COVID-19.

Early life and education
He was born in Bhusawar city of the present-day Bharatpur district of Rajasthan state in a Dalit family on 15 January 1932 to Nathilal Pahadia and Chanda Devi. He held M.A., LL.B., M.S.J. College, Bharatpur, Maharaja College, Jaipur and Law College Rajasthan University. He was an Ambedkarite.

Career
He was Chief Minister of Rajasthan state from 6 June 1980 to 14 July 1981 and was the first Dalit from Rajasthan to hold this position.

Pahadia served Rajasthan Legislative Assembly from 1998 till 2008 and 1980 to 1990.

He represented Sawai Madhopur (Lok Sabha constituency) in the 2nd Lok Sabha and Bayana constituency in Rajasthan in the 4th, 5th and 7th Lok Sabha. His wife Shanti Pahadia was also a member of Lok Sabha. He was governor of Bihar from 3 March 1989 to 2 February 1990. Later, he served and was appointed the governor of Haryana from 27 July 2009 to 26 July 2014.

References

External links
 Jagannath Pahadia appointed governor of Haryana
 Former Chief Ministers of Rajasthan (photo gallery)
 By ashok Bharty Raj.Patrika
 Official biographical sketch in Parliament of India website

1932 births
2021 deaths
Chief Ministers of Rajasthan
Indian National Congress politicians from Rajasthan
Rajasthani people
Governors of Haryana
India MPs 1957–1962
India MPs 1967–1970
India MPs 1971–1977
India MPs 1980–1984
Lok Sabha members from Rajasthan
Chief ministers from Indian National Congress
Kurukshetra University
Rajya Sabha members from Rajasthan
Governors of Bihar
Dalit politicians
People from Bharatpur district
Deaths from the COVID-19 pandemic in India